The Africa Restoration Alliance (ARA) is a South African political party founded in December 2020 by the former African Christian Democratic Party (ACDP) national executive committee chairperson, Jerome Swartz. Swartz cited bribery and corruption in his former party as the reason for leaving.

In April 2021, the party protested in support of Beatrice Adams, whose child was murdered by a previously convicted rapist who had received parole. Among the party members protesting was Zephany Nurse, who was snatched from Groote Schuur Hospital when she was two days old.

In July 2021, in the runup to the 2021 South African municipal elections, the party was accused by both the ACDP and a Democratic Alliance councillor of pasting their campaign posters over boards belonging to their respective parties.

References 

Political parties in South Africa
Political parties established in 2020